Glipa brevicauda is a species of beetle in the genus Glipa. It was described in 1931. It is highly aggressive.

References

brevicauda
Beetles described in 1931